Gira is a river located in the Dang District of India. The river on its way touches Singana, Girmal, Bardipada and Divadiawan villages of Dang district and finally meets Mindhola River in the Songadh taluka.

References

Rivers of Gujarat
Dang district, India
Rivers of India